Saunakallio railway station is a Helsinki commuter rail station in the town of Järvenpää, Finland, 39 km (24.5 mi) north from the Helsinki Central railway station.

The station was the terminus for the G commuter line that ran from Helsinki to Saunakallio. The service was started on 4 June 2007. It was discontinued in 2011 in order to improve management of traffic and timetable keeping on the Main Line especially during winter conditions.

References 

Railway stations in Uusimaa
Railway stations opened in 1948
Järvenpää